This list of African American Historic Places in Mississippi is based on a book by the National Park Service, The Preservation Press, the National Trust for Historic Preservation, and the National Conference of State Historic Preservation Officers.

Some of these sites are on the National Register of Historic Places (NR) as independent sites or as part of a larger historic district. Several of the sites are National Historic Landmarks (NRL). Others have Mississippi historical markers (HM). The citation on historical markers is given in the reference. The location listed is the nearest community to the site. More precise locations are given in the reference.

Adams County
 Natchez
 China Grove Plantation
 Glen Aubin
 Oakland
 Pine Ridge Church
 Smith-Bontura-Evans House
 William Johnson House

Alcorn County
 Alcorn
 Oakland Chapel

Bolivar County
 Mound Bayou
 I.T. Montgomery House

Claiborne County
Port Gibson
 Golden West Cemetery

Hancock County
 Bay St. Louis
 Beach Boulevard Historic District
 Sycamore Street Historic District
 Washington Street Historic District

Harrison County
 Biloxi
 Pleasant Reed Home

Hinds County

 Jackson
 Alex Williams House
 Ayer Hall
 Farish Street Neighborhood Historic District
 Mississippi State Capitol
 Smith Robertson Elementary School,
 West Capitol Street Historic District
 Tougaloo
 John W. Boddie House

Jackson County
 Ocean Springs
 Thomas Isaac Keys House

Jefferson County
Lorman
 Alcorn State University Historic District

Jefferson Davis County
 Prentiss
 1907 House

Lauderdale County

 Meridian
 Carnegie Branch Library
 Masonic Temple
 Meridian Baptist Seminary
 Merrehope Historic District
 Wechsler School

Leflore County
 Greenwood
 Wesley Memorial Methodist Episcopal

Marshall County
 Holly Springs
 Mississippi Industrial College Historic District
 Oakview
 Sprires Bolling House

Monroe County
 Aberdeen
 South Central Aberdeen Historic District

Oktibbeha County
 Starkville
 Odd Fellows Cemetery

Warren County
 Vicksburg
 Beulah Cemetery

References

Mississippi geography-related lists
African-American history of Mississippi
Mississippi
Historic sites in Mississippi